Bembidion rusticum is a species of ground beetle in the family Carabidae. It is found in North America.

Subspecies
These two subspecies belong to the species Bembidion rusticum:
 Bembidion rusticum lenensoides Lindroth, 1963
 Bembidion rusticum rusticum Casey, 1918

References

Further reading

 

rusticum
Articles created by Qbugbot
Beetles described in 1918